Titãs – 84 94 Dois is the second compilation album released by Brazilian rock band Titãs, and also the second featuring the main hits of the band since their first album, Titãs, released in 1984, until their seventh one, Titanomaquia, released in 1993.

Track listing

References

1994 compilation albums
Titãs compilation albums
Warner Music Group compilation albums
Albums produced by Jack Endino
Portuguese-language compilation albums